Daniel Chislov (Hebrew: דניאל צ'יסלוב; born 1 May 1995) is an Israeli badminton player.

He won a gold medal at the 2017 Maccabiah Games.

Achievements

BWF International Challenge/Series 
Men's singles

Men's doubles 

  BWF International Challenge tournament
  BWF International Series tournament
  BWF Future Series tournament

References

External links 
 
 

1995 births
Living people
Israeli male badminton players
Competitors at the 2017 Maccabiah Games
Maccabiah Games gold medalists for Israel
Maccabiah Games silver medalists for Israel
Maccabiah Games medalists in badminton
21st-century Israeli people